Platyschkuhria is a genus of North American flowering plants in the daisy family.

 Species
 Platyschkuhria integrifolia (A.Gray) Rydb. - Utah, Arizona, New Mexico, Colorado, Wyoming, Montana (Carbon County)
 Platyschkuhria nudicaulis (M.E.Jones) Rydb. - Utah
 Platyschkuhria ourolepis (S.F.Blake) Ellison - Utah

References

Asteraceae genera
Bahieae
Flora of the Southwestern United States
Taxa named by Asa Gray